Scène de vie (Eng: Moments in Life) is a studio album recorded by the French artist Patricia Kaas. It was her second album and was released in 1990. It confirmed the singer's potential, reaching the top of the albums chart in France.

Background

In 1990, Kaas' first album, Mademoiselle chante..., was still well placed in the French charts. It was a huge success, and she decided to release a second album in order to consolidate her popularity. She left her former record company, Polydor, in order to join CBS/Sony. Cyril Prieur and Richard Walter from the firm 'Talent Sorcier' (Paris) replaced Bernard Schwartz and became her new managers. They both contributed significantly to the singer's success.

With her new record company, she produced her second studio album Scène de vie in 1990. As with the previous album, many tracks were composed by Barbelivien and Bernheim. With the song "Kennedy Rose" (dedicated to Rose Kennedy, matriarch of the Kennedy family and mother of former U.S. president John F. Kennedy), Kaas again worked with Elisabeth Depardieu and François Bernheim ; this collaboration was more successful than "Jalouse", even if it did not chart highly.

In France, there were four singles from this album, but only the first reached the top ten: "Les hommes qui passent" (#7), "Les Mannequins d'osier" (#21), "Kennedy Rose" (#36) and "Regarde les riches" (#27). They were not certified by the SNEP.

Chart performances

In France, Scène de vie went to #2 on May 10, 1990, before reaching the top of the albums chart and staying there for ten weeks. It spent 38 weeks in the top ten and 78 in the top 50. It went Diamond disc eight years after its release, just as Mademoiselle chante... had done before it.

In Switzerland, the album entered the chart on May 6, 1990, at #17, and reached a peak position of #15. It remained on the chart for six weeks, then recharted for a further 16 weeks, from January 20 to May 5, 1991, entering the top 30 for eight weeks. It was certified double platinum in 1993.

The album also went platinum in Canada, after being gold on March 28, 1991.

Track listing

Album credits

Antonietti, Pascault & Associés - design
Slim Batteux - backing vocals
François Bernheim - backing vocals
Patrick Bourgoin - saxophone
Ann Calvert - backing vocals
André Ceccarelli - drums
Jean-Paul Celea - double bass
Bertrand Châtenet - arranger, engineer, producer
Jean-Yves D'Angelo - arranger, organ, piano
Guy Delacroix - bass guitar
Alain Duplantier - photography
Thierry Durbet - arranger
Bruno Fourrier - engineer
Pierre Gossez - soprano saxophone
Jérôme Gueguen - piano, synthesizer
Bruno Lambert - engineer, mixing

Franck Langolff - arranger, producer
Renaud Letang - assistant engineer
Sophie Masson - assistant engineer
Jacques Mercier - backing vocals
Jean-Jacques Milteau - harmonica
Philippe Osman - arranger, guitar, programming, producer, synthesizer
André Perriat - mastering
Cyril Prieur - management
Jacques Romensky - assistant engineer & mixing
Serge Roux - saxophone
Tony Russo - trumpet
Kamil Rustam - arranger, guitar
Claude Salmiéri - drums
Claude Samard - arranger, guitar
Jean-Jacques Souplet - producer
Richard Walter - management

Charts

Weekly charts

Year-end charts

Certifications and sales

References

1990 albums
Patricia Kaas albums
CBS Disques albums